Dracula 2012 is a 2013 Indian supernatural horror romantic film directed by Vinayan, starring Sudheer Sukumaran, Prabhu, Monal Gajjar, Nassar, Shraddha Das and Thilakan. 

The film was partially re-shot in Tamil and Telugu as Naangam Pirai  and Punnami Ratri (Night of the Full Moon), respectively. The film was dubbed in English for a Western release and later dubbed in Hindi as "Aur Ek Dracula" (One more Dracula). Portions of the film were shot in Bran Castle in Romania. The cost of the film was 350 million and was originally released on 8 February 2013.

Premise
While on his honeymoon in Romania, a man visits the Bran Castle and upon his return to the hotel, kills his bride. He then returns to his homeland and begins to hunt for new victims.

Cast
Sudheer Sukumaran as Roy Thomas / William D'Souza / Count Dracula
Monal Gajjar as Meena
Shraddha Das as Thaara
Prabhu as Robinson 
Nassar as Suryamoorthy
Aryan as Raju
Priya Nambiar as Lucy Thomas
Thilakan
Krishna as Benny IPS

Music

Punnami Raathri (Telugu version)

Naangam Pirai (Tamil version)

Reception

Critical response
Dracula 3D won mostly unfavourable reviews upon release with critics criticizing the visual effects, plot and performancesSify.com called the film "a sheer waste of time and money" as well as commenting that "the film has been presented in 3D but the effects look shoddy and mostly amateurish". The film ran successfully for 50 days.

See also
Vampire film
List of Malayalam horror films

References

External links
 

2010s Malayalam-language films
2013 3D films
2013 films
Indian 3D films
Films shot in Romania
Dracula films
Indian vampire films
Films directed by Vinayan
2013 horror films
Films set in castles